Charles Brooks Jr. (September 1, 1942 – December 7, 1982), also known as Shareef Ahmad Abdul-Rahim, was a convicted murderer who was the first person to be executed using lethal injection. He was the first prisoner executed in Texas since 1964, and the first African-American to be executed anywhere in the United States in the post-Gregg era.

Biography

Early life

Brooks was raised in a family in Fort Worth, Texas. He attended I.M. Terrell High School, where he played football.

He had served time at the United States Penitentiary, Leavenworth for illegal possession of firearms.

Crime and trial
On December 14, 1976, Brooks went to a used car lot and asked to test drive a car. The mechanic, David Gregory, accompanied him on the drive. After Brooks picked up his accomplice, Woody Loudres, they put the mechanic in the trunk of the car and Brooks and Loudres drove to a motel. There the mechanic was bound to a chair with coat hangers, gagged with tape and then shot in the head. 

Neither Brooks nor Loudres would say who fired the shot and therefore the state sought the death penalty for both men. Brooks received the death sentence on April 25, 1978. Loudres also received the death penalty, but his conviction was overturned on appeal, and he entered a plea bargain in exchange for a 40-year sentence. He was paroled after serving 11 years.

Conversion to Islam and execution
The Supreme Court of the United States rejected by 6–3 a petition to grant a stay of execution. The State Board of Pardons and Paroles recommended by 2–1 that the execution proceed.

Brooks was held on death row at the Ellis Unit that housed condemned men.

After a last meal consisting of a T-bone steak, french fries, ketchup, Worcestershire sauce, biscuits, peach cobbler and iced tea, Brooks was rolled into the death chamber at the Huntsville Unit in Huntsville, Texas. There he made his final statement. Brooks had converted to Islam while in prison and said a prayer.

Brooks was executed on December 7, 1982 at the age of 40.

See also
 Capital punishment in Texas
 Capital punishment in the United States
 List of people executed in Texas, 1982–1989

References

External links
Supreme Court Ruling from FindLaw.com. Retrieved 25 August 2005
Texas gurney in 1982

1942 births
1982 deaths
1976 murders in the United States
American people executed for murder
Executed people from Texas
20th-century executions by Texas
People from Fort Worth, Texas
People executed by Texas by lethal injection
People convicted of murder by Texas
Executed African-American people
African-American Muslims
Converts to Islam
20th-century executions of American people
20th-century African-American people